Events from the 1430s in Denmark.

Incumbents
 Monarch – Eric of Pomerania (until 1439)

Events

1435
 July – The Dano-Hanseatic War (1426–1435) ends when a peace treaty with the Hanseatic League is concluded in Vordingborg.
Undated  The Priory of Our Lady in Helsingør is established for a group of Carmelite friars from Landskrona.
 Undated  Mariager Abbey is established on a hill overlooking the ferry across Mariager Fjord by the Bridgettines, the last monastic order to reach Denmark before the Reformation, on land acquired in the late 1420s from the dissolved Randers Abbey. 

1439
 Eric of Pomerania is deposed by the National Councils of Denmark and Sweden, succeeded in the following year by his nephew Christopher of Bavaria.

Deaths
1431
 15 July – Jens Andersen Lodehat, bishop

References

1430s in Denmark